The Romanian Tennis Federation (FRT) (Romanian: Federația Română de Tenis) is the governing body of tennis in Romania. It is based in Bucharest and its current president is former Romanian tennis player Ion Țiriac.

It also organizes the Romania Davis Cup team and the Romania Fed Cup team.

The federation was formed in 1912 and became a member of the International Tennis Federation (ITF) in the same year.

References

External links 
 Official website
 Romanian Olympic Committee: Tennis Federation

Romania
Tennis in Romania
Tennis
1912 establishments in Romania